Edith Thompson (1848-1929) was a historian and lexicographer. She wrote "History of England" the second volume of the "Historical Course for Schools", which was devised and edited by Edward Freeman, with whom she corresponded regularly. She was also a prolific contributor to the first edition of the Oxford English Dictionary. Along with her sister, Elizabeth Perronet Thompson, she provided 15,000 quotations for the dictionary. She also subedited the volume for "C" words and proofread volumes from "D" words onwards.

She was the granddaughter of Thomas Perronet Thompson, a notable abolitionist, about whom she wrote a biography that went unpublished.

References 

1848 births
1929 deaths
19th-century English historians
20th-century English historians
English lexicographers
English women
British women historians
Women lexicographers